Bessingham is a village and former civil parish, now in the parish of Sustead, in the North Norfolk district of the English county of Norfolk. In 1931 the parish had a population of 122. On 1 April 1935 the parish was abolished and merged with Sustead.

The village's name means 'Homestead/village of Basa's people'.

The church, which is dedicated to St. Mary the Virgin (and for a short while after the Reformation to St. Andrew), is one of the oldest round tower churches in England and was restored in 1869.  Many of its stained glass windows were installed in the late nineteenth and early twentieth centuries and designed by C. E. Kempe and Co. and James Powell and Sons.

The manor was acquired by the Paston family, who are chiefly remembered for their fifteenth-century letters, and later the Anson family, and in 1766 the village's main estate was purchased by John Spurrell, a yeoman farmer from neighbouring Thurgarton.  The Spurrells expanded the estate, benefiting from the enclosure of the common land in the 1820s, and in 1870 Daniel Spurrell built a new Manor House, with lawns, a walled garden and parkland laid out around it.  Daniel's daughter Katherine Anne Spurrell bred daffodils in the grounds of the Manor House, some of which received the Award of Merit from the Royal Horticultural Society, and the daffodil Narcissus 'Katherine Spurrell' was named after her by Edward Leeds.  Another famous resident of the Manor House in the late nineteenth century was a bear, brought to Bessingham from India by Daniel's son Robert, a cavalry officer.

Bessingham was described as a 'ghost village' in the 1960s when most of its cottages stood empty or in ruins.  The Manor House became derelict after the estate was sold in 1970.  It has since been restored and now operates as self-catering holiday accommodation.

St. Mary's Church holds a small plaque to the two Bessingham men who gave their lives in the First World War. They are listed as:
 Private Charles J. Tuck (1894-1917), 5th Battalion, Royal Norfolk Regiment
 Private Herbert E. Roper (d.1918), Royal Sussex Regiment

References

External links
 St Mary's on the European Round Tower Churches Website

Villages in Norfolk
Former civil parishes in Norfolk
North Norfolk